Jane Eyre is a novel by Charlotte Brontë

Jane Eyre may also refer to:
Jane Eyre (character),  the novel's protagonist

Film and television adaptations
 Jane Eyre (1910 film), starring Irma Taylor
 Jane Eyre (1921 film), starring Mabel Ballin
 Jane Eyre (1934 film), starring Virginia Bruce
 Jane Eyre (1943 film), starring Joan Fontaine
 Jane Eyre (1956 TV series), starring Daphne Slater
 Jane Eyre (1963 TV series), starring Ann Bell
 Jane Eyre (1970 film), starring Susannah York
 Jane Eyre (1973 miniseries), starring Sorcha Cusack
 Jane Eyre (1983 TV serial), starring Zelah Clarke
 Jane Eyre (1996 film), starring Charlotte Gainsbourg
 Jane Eyre (1997 film), starring Samantha Morton
 Jane Eyre (2006 miniseries), starring Ruth Wilson
 Jane Eyre (2011 film), starring Mia Wasikowska

Musical adaptations
Jane Eyre (musical), 1995 musical with music by Paul Gordon
Jane Eyre (Joubert), 1997 opera by John Joubert with a libretto by Kenneth Birkin
Jane Eyre (Berkeley), 2000 opera by Michael Berkeley with a libretto by David Malouf
Jane Eyre (Karchin), 2016 opera by Louis Karchin

See also
Eyre (disambiguation)
Adaptations of Jane Eyre